Nobbs is a surname. Notable people with the surname include:

Andre Nobbs, political figure from the Australian territory of Norfolk Island
David Nobbs (born 1935), English comedy writer
George Hunn Nobbs (1799–1884), English missionary on Pitcairn Island then Norfolk Island
Jordan Nobbs (born 1992), English footballer who plays for FA WSL club Arsenal Ladies
Kaitlin Nobbs (born 1997), Australian field hockey player
Keith Nobbs (born 1979), American stage, television, and film actor
Percy Erskine Nobbs (1875–1964), Canadian architect born in Haddington, Scotland

Fictional characters
Nobby Nobbs, a character in the Discworld novels of Terry Pratchett

See also
Albert Nobbs, a 2011 drama film, directed by Rodrigo Garcia and starring actress Glenn Close, who portrays the main title's character

Surnames from given names